Boxing from St. Nicholas Arena was an American sports program originally broadcast on NBC from 1946 to 1948, and later on the now-defunct DuMont Television Network from 1954 to 1956.

Broadcast history
Before having their own program, boxing matches from St. Nicholas Arena were broadcast as part of the Gillette Cavalcade of Sports.

NBC
NBC broadcast Boxing From St. Nicholas Arena twice a week—at 9:30 p.m. on Mondays and at 10 p.m. on Tuesdays. The series ended on May 9, 1949, as a result of budgetary problems at the sponsoring Gillette Company.

DuMont
The DuMont version was hosted by Chris Schenkel; Schenkel took over for Dennis James, who had hosted most of DuMont's boxing telecasts prior to 1954.

This regularly scheduled program, which aired boxing matches from St. Nicholas Arena in New York City on Monday nights, is notable for being the final program to air on DuMont. The last network-aired program was broadcast on August 6, 1956, though a few remaining programs were seen locally on New York's WABD afterward.

With limited finances, DuMont aired many sports programs throughout its history. Boxing, wrestling, basketball, and football were always network mainstays, even during prime time, as they were cheaper than most scripted programs (this in an era before sports rights fees accelerated to their modern levels) and filled large programming blocks that would otherwise have gone unfilled. Most of DuMont's regular series were cancelled on April 1, 1955, and the last non-sports program, the panel show What's the Story, left the airwaves on September 23, 1955, leaving only a few cheaply produced  sports programs on the schedule.

However, by August 1956, even DuMont's sports programs, including Boxing From St. Nicholas Arena, were axed.

Episode status
About 60 episodes of the DuMont version, including the final program on August 6, 1956, survive at the UCLA Film and Television Archive. However, some of these episodes are from the non-network version which continued to run on WABD after the network closed (these are also notable due to the rarity of kinescopes of local programming aired on United States television stations during the 1950s).

See also
List of programs broadcast by the DuMont Television Network
List of surviving DuMont Television Network broadcasts
1954-55 United States network television schedule
1955-56 United States network television schedule
Boxing From Jamaica Arena (July 1940-May 1942, 1946-1949)
Amateur Boxing Fight Club (September 1949 – 1950)
Wrestling From Marigold (September 1949 – 1955)
Boxing From Eastern Parkway (May 1952-May 1954)
Saturday Night at the Garden (1950-1951)
HBO Boxing (1973-2018)

References

Bibliography
David Weinstein, The Forgotten Network: DuMont and the Birth of American Television (Philadelphia: Temple University Press, 2004) 
Alex McNeil, Total Television, Fourth edition (New York: Penguin Books, 1980) 
Tim Brooks and Earle Marsh, The Complete Directory to Prime Time Network TV Shows, Third edition (New York: Ballantine Books, 1964)

External links
 
 DuMont historical website

1946 American television series debuts
1956 American television series endings
American sports television series
Black-and-white American television shows
St. Nicholas Arena
DuMont Television Network original programming
English-language television shows
NBC Sports
DuMont sports programming